Seager is a former village in Ulster County, New York, United States, within Catskill Park and the Catskill Mountains.

It was a small village that vanished after tanning in the Catskills ended in the late 19th century. Today it consists of one house and a hiking trailhead for the Seager West Branch Trail.

Hamlets in New York (state)
Former villages in New York (state)
Catskills
Hamlets in Ulster County, New York